Atlantic Adventure is a 1935 American comedy mystery film directed by Albert S. Rogell and starring Nancy Carroll, Lloyd Nolan and Harry Langdon.

Premise
A newspaper reporter and his photographer stow away aboard an ocean liner in an effort to catch a murderer aboard. They are also joined by the reporter's girlfriend.

Partial cast
 Nancy Carroll as Helen Murdock  
 Lloyd Nolan as Dan Miller  
 Harry Langdon as Snapper McGillicuddy  
 Arthur Hohl as Frank Julian  
 Robert Middlemass as Harry Van Dieman  
 John Wray as Mitts Coster  
 E.E. Clive as McIntosh  
 Dwight Frye as Spike Jonas

References

Bibliography
 Paul L. Nemcek. The films of Nancy Carroll. 1969.

External links
 

1935 films
1930s comedy mystery films
American comedy mystery films
Films directed by Albert S. Rogell
American black-and-white films
Columbia Pictures films
Seafaring films
1935 comedy films
1930s English-language films
1930s American films